Habrodais is a Nearctic genus of butterflies in the family Lycaenidae.

Species
Habrodais grunus (Boisduval, 1852)
Habrodais poodiae Brown & Faulkner, 1982

References

Theclini
Lycaenidae genera
Taxa named by Samuel Hubbard Scudder